Down to Nothing (or DTN) was a straight edge hardcore punk band from Richmond, Virginia. Since their inception in 2000, the band has toured all over the world. Their most recent studio recording is the 2013 LP Life on the James on Revelation Records, preceded by CD/vinyl EP titled All My Sons released in 2010 on Reaper Records (US) and Dead Souls Records (AUS). Down to Nothing's first two albums, Save It for the Birds and Splitting Headache, are currently out of print but were re-released in February 2008 on one CD/LP titled Unbreakable. In 2009 singer David Wood joined Terror as bassist and backing vocals, this tenure would last until 2017. Since their appearance in 2019 at the Have Heart reunion shows at the Worcester Palladium, the band has been inactive.

Members of Down to Nothing have also played in Terror and Trapped Under Ice.

Members

Current
 David Wood – Vocals
 Daniel Spector – Drums
 Jared Carman – Bass
 Alan Long – Guitar
 Matt Carr – Guitar

Past 
 Scott Eckert – bass
 Adam Barker – bass
 Ryan Groat – guitar
 Ryan Wall
 Hunter Jennings – guitar

Discography

Studio albums
 Save It for the Birds (Thorp Records, 2003)
 Splitting Headache (Thorp Records, 2005)
 The Most (Revelation Records, 2007)
 Life on the James (Revelation Records, 2013)

Split releases
 Split 7"/CD with  Kids Like Us (Knife or Death Records, 2005)
 Split 7" with On Thin Ice (2005)
 Split with 50 Lions (6131 Records, 2008)

EPs and other releases 
Down to Nothing Demo (Dead By 23, 2002)
Higher Learning (Revelation Revords, 2006)
 Unbreakable (Revelation Records, 2008)
 All My Sons (Reaper Records, Dead Souls Records, 2010)
Live! On the James (Revelation Records, 2017)

References

External links 
Down to Nothing official MySpace page
Reaper Records
Revelation Records

Hardcore punk groups from Virginia
Straight edge groups
Musical groups established in 2000
Revelation Records artists